The 2023 Lazio regional election took place on 12 and 13 February 2023. It was held concurrently with the 2023 Lombard regional election, as decided by the Italian government on 9 December 2022. On 12 October 2022, the president of Lazio Nicola Zingaretti decided to step down, having been elected to the national parliament.

The election saw the centre-right coalition win with a majority of the popular vote, gaining a 11-seat majority and taking control of the Regional Council of Lazio for the first time since the 2010 Lazio regional election.

Electoral system 
The Regional Council of Lazio is elected with a mixed system: 39 councilmembers are chosen with a form of proportional representation using a largest remainder method with open lists, while 11 councilmembers are elected with a plurality-at-large voting system with closed lists. One seat is for the elected president.

Political  parties and candidates 
Below are listed the parties and candidates for the election.

Opinion polling

Candidates

Hypothetical candidates

Political parties

Results

References 

2023 elections in Italy
21st century in Lazio
Elections in Lazio